Daria Nauer (born 21 May 1966) is a retired Swiss long-distance runner, who won a bronze medal in 10,000 metres at the 1994 European Championships in Helsinki in a Swiss record time of 31:35.96 minutes.

Achievements

(h) Indicates overall position in qualifying heats.

External links

1966 births
Living people
Swiss female long-distance runners
Athletes (track and field) at the 1996 Summer Olympics
Athletes (track and field) at the 2000 Summer Olympics
Olympic athletes of Switzerland
European Athletics Championships medalists
Swiss female marathon runners